is a Japanese women's professional shogi player ranked 4-dan.

Promotion history
Takebe's promotion history is as follows.
 Women's Professional Apprentice League: 1995
 2-kyū: October 1, 1995
 1-kyū: April 1, 1996
 1-dan: October 19, 1996
 2-dan: April 1, 1997
 3-dan: March 20, 2003
 4-dan: January 16, 2019

Note: All ranks are women's professional ranks.

Titles and other championships
Takebe has appeared in one women's major title match. She was the challenger for the 6th  title in 1996, but lost to Ichiyo Shimizu 2 games to none.

References

External links
 ShogiHub: Takebe, Sayuri

Japanese shogi players
Living people
Women's professional shogi players
1964 births
People from Nagano Prefecture
Professional shogi players from Nagano Prefecture